Tashi Lundup (born October 5, 1984) is an Indian cross-country skier who has competed since 2005. He was born in Ladakh in India on October 5, 1984. He finished 83rd in the 15 km event at the 2010 Winter Olympics in Vancouver.

Lundup served in the Ladakh Scouts regiment of the Indian Army.
Lundup also finished 114th in the individual sprint event at the FIS Nordic World Ski Championships 2009 in Liberec.

His best career finish was third in a 10 km event at Iran in 2007.

External links
 

1984 births
Cross-country skiers at the 2010 Winter Olympics
Living people
Indian male cross-country skiers
Olympic cross-country skiers of India
Cross-country skiers at the 2007 Asian Winter Games
Cross-country skiers at the 2011 Asian Winter Games
People from Leh district
Skiers from Ladakh
Indian Army personnel